Acquired idiopathic generalized anhidrosis (AIGA) is characterized by generalized absence of sweating without other autonomic and neurologic dysfunction.

AIGA is classified into 3 subgroups: idiopathic pure sudomotor failure (IPSF), sweat gland failure (SGF), and sudomotor neuropathy, with each subgroup presenting a different pathogenesis.

Diagnosis

Quantitative sudomotor axon reflex test and microneurography are used in the diagnosis of AIGA. However, these refined methods are mostly used for research purposes and not generally available. 

Skin biopsy analysis may play a crucial role in the identification of AIGA subgroups.

See also

Hypohidrosis

References

External links 

Conditions of the skin appendages